The 1998 African Women's Handball Championship was the 13th edition of the African Women's Handball Championship, held in South Africa from 18 to 28 october 1998. It acted as the African qualifying tournament for the 1999 World Women's Handball Championship.

Preliminary round

Group A

Group B

Knockout stage

Bracket

Semifinals

Fifth place game

Third place game

Final

Final ranking

External links
Results on todor66.com

1998 Women
African Women's Handball Championship
African Women's Handball Championship
African Women's Handball Championship
1998 in African handball
Women's handball in South Africa
1998 in South African women's sport
October 1998 sports events in Africa